The River Road Wine Trail is a Salinas Valley roadway trail for wine-tasting following the River Road along the western banks of the Salinas River (California).  It is not to be confused with the Great River Road Wine Trail that follows along the banks of the Mississippi River.  It is notably referenced in numerous books and magazines.

History
The River Road (Monterey County, California G-17) follows along the banks of the Salinas River and predates the wineries by many decades.  It runs along the length of the Santa Lucia Highlands AVA.  The earliest grape plantings, however, were in the 1790s, with the arrival of the Spanish missions in California.   The arrival of commercial wineries (and wine-tasting), began in the early 1970s, with initial plantings by Smith at Paraiso, by McFarland at Sleepy Hollow, by Johnson at La Estancia, and by Hahn at Smith & Hook.  The hot days  of the Salinas Valley make for good Syrahs, and the cool foggy nights are ideal for Chardonnay, Pinot Noir and other cool-climate varieties.
Currently there are at least 24  wineries in the Salinas Valley with at least 13 tasting rooms lining River Road, going from Salinas, California south to Greenfield, California. They are perched on the Santa Lucia Highlands, and present great views of the rich farmlands below.
The Salinas River Wine Trail was named by Wine Enthusiast Magazine in the top ten wine travel destinations in the world, with only two other locations (New York and Oregon) from North America.

Distance to wine-tasting facilities
The Wine-Tasting Facilities are usually encountered driving south from Highway 68 where it crosses the Salinas River.  Using that as a starting point, the Wine-Tasting distances are tabulated below:

1. Odonata Wines South • 645 River Road, Salinas – 7 mi.

2. Rustique Wines • 1010 River Road, Salinas – 10 mi.

3. Pessagno Winery • 1645 River Rd, Salinas – 16 mi.

4. Manzoni Vineyards • 30981 River Road, Soledad – 17 mi.

5. Puma Road Winery • 32720 River Road, Soledad – 23 mi.

6. Wrath Wines • 35801 Foothill Road, Soledad – 24 mi.

7. Hahn Family • 37700 Foothill Road, Soledad – 26 mi.

8. Smith Family Wines • 38060 Paraiso Springs Road, Soledad – 31 mi.

9. Joyce Winery • 38740 Los Coches Road, Soledad – 35 mi.

Nearby wine trail
At the end of the River Road Wine Trail is the start of another wine trail.  At Greenfield, if one takes the Arroyo Seco Road westward, it branches into the Carmel Valley Road from which one can then take the Carmel Valley Wine Trail northwards, passing Carmel Valley Village, California and ending up in Carmel-by-the-Sea, California.

References

External links
    River Road Wine Trail
  Odonata Wines
   Rustique Wines
  Manzoni Wines
  Scheid Vineyards
  Smith Family Wines
 Hahn Wines
 Pessagno Wines
 Wrath Wines
 Talbott Vineyards
 Boekenoogen Wines
   McIntyre Vineyards
 Map of Wineries

Tourist attractions in Monterey County, California
Roads in Monterey County, California
Salinas, California
Trails